Players and pairs who neither have high enough rankings nor receive wild cards may participate in a qualifying tournament held one week before the annual US Open.

Seeds

Qualifiers

Lucky losers

Draw

First qualifier

Second qualifier

Third qualifier

Fourth qualifier

References

 Official results archive (ATP)
 Official results archive (ITF)

Men's Doubles Qualifying